Liles Clifton Burke (born June 11, 1969) is a United States district judge of the United States District Court for the Northern District of Alabama. His official duty station is the United States Courthouse at Huntsville, Alabama.  He previously was an Associate Judge of the Alabama Court of Criminal Appeals.

Early life and education 
Burke is a native of Arab, Alabama, and was educated in that city's public school system. He received his Bachelor of Arts from the University of Alabama in 1991 and Juris Doctor from the University of Alabama School of Law in 1994.

Career
Upon graduation from law school, he began practicing with his father, Claud Burke, at the law firm of Burke & Beuoy, P.C., where he represented businesses and individuals in general practice, including domestic, criminal, civil litigation, juvenile, and probate matters.

Burke attended The JAG School at the University of Virginia and entered the U.S. Army JAG Corps.  He holds the rank of Major and is currently assigned to Joint Forces Headquarters in Montgomery, Alabama.

He also served as a Municipal Prosecutor and Municipal Attorney for the City of Arab, and was named as the Municipal Judge for that City in 2001. He held that office until 2006 when he was appointed Marshall County District Judge by Governor of Alabama Bob Riley. In 2008, Burke was elected to a full term on the District Court without opposition. Burke began Marshall County's first family drug court, and along with District Judge Tim Riley, implemented one of Alabama's first domestic violence courts. Additionally, he served as an officer in both the Alabama District Judges Association and the Alabama Juvenile Judges Association.

In 2011, Governor Robert J. Bentley appointed Burke to the Alabama Court of Criminal Appeals, where he served until becoming a United States district judge.  He was elected to a six-year term in 2012 without opposition.  While on the Court of Criminal Appeals, Burke also served as the president of the Alabama Appellate Judges Association.

Burke has been active over the past many years in several charitable and community organizations, leading the Marshall County United Way fund drive, serving as President of the Arab Chamber of Commerce, and serving on the board of the Marshall County Healthcare Authority. He is Methodist, a Rotarian, and an alumnus of Leadership Alabama.

Federal judicial service 

On July 13, 2017, President Donald Trump announced his intent to nominate Burke to serve as a United States district judge of the United States District Court for the Northern District of Alabama. On July 19, 2017, his nomination was sent to the Senate. He was nominated to the seat vacated by Charles Lynwood Smith Jr., who assumed senior status on August 31, 2013. On October 4, 2017, a hearing on his nomination was held before the Senate Judiciary Committee. On October 26, 2017, his nomination was reported out of committee by an 11–9 vote.

On January 3, 2018, his nomination was returned to the president under Rule XXXI, Paragraph 6 of the United States Senate. On January 5, 2018, President Donald Trump announced his intent to renominate Burke to a federal judgeship. On January 8, 2018, his renomination was sent to the Senate. On January 18, 2018, his nomination was reported out of committee by an 11–10 vote. On October 11, 2018, his nomination was confirmed by a 55–40 vote. He received his judicial commission on October 17, 2018.

Prominent cases 

In May 2022, Burke issued a preliminary injunction blocking enforcement of an Alabama law which criminalized transgender minors from using hormone therapy and puberty blockers. He concluded that the law had a substantial likelihood of being unconstitutional because it interfered with parents' fundamental rights to direct the medical care of their children and constituted unlawful sex discrimination. 
The case, Eknes-Tucker v. Marshall, will be set for a final hearing on the merits sometime this year.

Personal life 

Burke is married to the former Natalie Jones of Jasper, Alabama; they have two children. Natalie Burke is the mayor of the Town of Cherokee Ridge, Alabama.

References

External links 
 
 
 Biography at U.S. District Court for the Northern District of Alabama

|-

1969 births
Living people
20th-century American lawyers
21st-century American judges
21st-century American lawyers
Alabama lawyers
Alabama Republicans
Alabama state court judges
United States Army Judge Advocate General's Corps
Judges of the United States District Court for the Northern District of Alabama
National Guard (United States) officers
People from Cullman, Alabama
United States Army officers
United States district court judges appointed by Donald Trump
University of Alabama alumni
University of Alabama School of Law alumni